Gordon Benjamin Isnor (10 May 1885 – 17 March 1973) was a Canadian merchant and parliamentarian.

A Liberal, he was elected four consecutive times to the House of Commons of Canada as the Member of Parliament representing the Nova Scotia electoral district of Halifax. He was first elected in the Canadian federal election of 1935, and was re-elected in 1940, 1945, and 1949.

On 28 July 1955, he was appointed to the Senate of Canada on the recommendation of Louis St-Laurent, and represented the senatorial division of Halifax-Dartmouth until his death.

Outside of his political life, Isnor was a successful Halifax businessman and operated a chain of clothing stores bearing his name in Nova Scotia. A street in Dartmouth, Nova Scotia was named after him, as well a senior citizens home in Halifax, the Gordon B. Isnor Manor.

Electoral record

References 

1885 births
1973 deaths
Canadian senators from Nova Scotia
Members of the House of Commons of Canada from Nova Scotia
Liberal Party of Canada MPs
Liberal Party of Canada senators
Nova Scotia Liberal Party MLAs
People from Dartmouth, Nova Scotia